The Greenford branch line is a  Network Rail suburban railway line in west London, England. It runs northerly from a triangular junction with the Great Western Main Line west of West Ealing to a central bay platform at Greenford station, where it has cross-platform interchanges to the London Underground's Central line. A triangular junction near Greenford connects to the Acton–Northolt line (formerly the New North Main Line). The line serves mainly the suburbs of Ealing and Greenford.

History

The opening of the line in 1903 coincided with the opening of a station at Park Royal on the Acton–Northolt line to serve the Royal Agricultural Show held in the grounds of part of the Twyford Abbey Estate. The Show ran from 15 June 1903 to 4 July 1903 during which period trains operated a circular service to and from Paddington via Park Royal and Ealing. Normal services started on 2 May 1904 and the links to Greenford station were put in on 1 October 1904.

The loop formed by the GWML, the branch and the ANL is sometimes used for turning trains for operational reasons such as balancing wheel wear. On weekends in 2008 during engineering works on the West Coast Main Line the line was used by Virgin Trains' Euston-Birmingham International "Blockade Buster" service which ran to Euston via Willesden, Acton Main Line, Ealing Broadway, Greenford, High Wycombe, Banbury and Coventry using pairs of 5-car Voyager sets. On two Sundays in February 2010, Chiltern and Wrexham & Shropshire trains were diverted to Paddington via the line while engineering work blocked the route to Marylebone.

Locally the service is called the 'Push-and-pull', a term which dates from the days of steam, when the engine could not change ends at Greenford and so the locomotive pulled the carriages one way and pushed them on the return run (see GWR Autocoach). In the 1950s the service frequently ran with two auto-trailers, one either side of the engine.

During the 1960s and '70s the service was normally operated by a  'Bubble Car' two-carriage diesel railcar, although this was later reduced to a single carriage.

As ,  and  have short platforms the maximum length of train that can be used is two cars.

In preparation for Crossrail, a new platform 5 has been constructed at West Ealing, and most services now terminate there.

In February 2022, GWR announced plans to test fast-charge battery technology on the route. As it is a low priority to be electrified, the only realistic alternative option to replace diesel powered rolling stock is with battery powered. The test will see the existing Class 165 units replaced by  battery-electric multiple unit trains produced by Vivarail, with the company's Fast Charge equipment installed in the bay platform at West Ealing. This will entail the installation of a conductor rail that becomes live only when a train is above it. This is then used to charge the lithium-ion batteries on the train, a process that would take about ten minutes.

Current service

The passenger service is provided by Great Western Railway. Trains from the branch terminate at West Ealing, except for one service from Paddington at the start of the day, and to Paddington at the end of the day.

There was a parliamentary service operated by Chiltern Railways from 10 December 2018 that, on weekdays, started from South Ruislip and ran non-stop along the line to West Ealing, before returning to West Ruislip. It previously operated to High Wycombe, but was later curtailed. It then became unidirectional from West Ealing to West Ruislip, running once a week on Wednesday mornings.

All services are operated with two-car Class 165 Turbo diesel trains. There is no Sunday service.

Passenger volume
These are statistics of passenger usage on the National Rail network along the Greenford branch line from the year beginning April 2002 to the year beginning April 2019.

Connections
 At Greenford: London Underground Central line.

References

Further reading 

 
 
 
 

Railway lines in London
Railway lines constructed by the Great Western Railway
Railway lines opened in 1903
Railway branch lines
Standard gauge railways in London
Transport in the London Borough of Ealing